Lee Bee Wah (born 6 October 1960), also known as Huajie, is a Malaysian-born Singaporean retired politician and engineer.

A member of the country's governing People's Action Party (PAP), she also served as MP for Ang Mo Kio GRC (Nee Soon South) from 6 May 2006 until her ward was carved out from Ang Mo Kio GRC for the formation of Nee Soon GRC in 2011. She served as a Member of Parliament (MP) of Nee Soon Group Representation Constituency (GRC) for Nee Soon South from 7 May 2011- 23 June 2020.

Lee announced her retirement from politics on 29 June 2020.

Early life
Lee was born on 6 October 1960 in Batu Pahat, Johor, Malaysia but grew up in Malacca. She is the eldest among seven siblings. Both her parents were rubber tappers.

Education
Lee received her primary education at Kiow Min Chinese Primary School and subsequently studied at Sekolah Dato' Dol Said, Notre Dame Convent, and Gajah Berang.

She attended the National University of Singapore (NUS) between 1981 and 1982 before attending the Nanyang Technological University (NTU) where she graduated with a Bachelor of Engineering degree in civil engineering in 1985. She then attended the University of Liverpool between 1989 and 1990 where she attained a Master of Science degree in engineering.

Described by her university as a "passionate" alumna, Lee started the Class of 1985 Pioneer Fund, a fundraising scheme which generated a few million dollars for academic incentives. In 1997, she became the NTU School of Civil & Environmental Engineering Alumni Association (NTU CEEAA)'s President until 2008. She was the recipient of the 2000 Nanyang Technological University Alumni Service Award by NTU. In 2006, Lee received the Nanyang Alumni Achievement Award from NTU. The same year, the Cambodian Government presented to her the Royal Government Gold Medal.

In 2011, the University of Liverpool presented to her an Honorary Doctorate. She was awarded the Nanyang Distinguished Alumni Award from NTU in 2012.

Career
Lee was the president of the Singapore Table Tennis Association (STTA) from 2008 till 2014.

Engineering career 
An engineer by training, in 1996, Lee established LBW Consultants LLP. Her firm was acquired by global engineering consultancy Meinhardt Group in 2014 where she is currently Group Director. Prior to joining politics, Lee was also a senior engineer at ST Construction and an assistant project manager at Wing Tai. She served as president of the Institution of Engineers Singapore from 2008 to 2010. She serves as Non Executive Chairman of listed company TEE Land Pte Ltd and Independent Director of Koh Brothers Group.

Political career
Lee served as MP for Ang Mo Kio GRC from 2006 till 2011, and Nee Soon GRC from 2011 to 2020. She was previously the Chairman of the Government Parliamentary Committee for National Development as well as for the Environment and Water Resources.

On 27 February 2019, Lee was criticized online for telling a story in Chinese about an "Ah Gong" during a budget debate in Parliament. In her story, she referred to Singaporeans as "Si Gui Kia", which is translated as ungrateful brats, for not being appreciative of what Ah Gong, i.e. the Singaporean government, has done for them. The video of her parliamentary speech quickly went viral.

Personal life
Lee is married with two children. She is a Buddhist.

References

External links
 Lee Bee Wah's profile – Parliament of Singapore

Singaporean women in politics
Singaporean women engineers
People from Johor
1960 births
Living people
Singaporean Buddhists
People's Action Party politicians
Members of the Parliament of Singapore
Singaporean people of Hokkien descent
Malaysian emigrants to Singapore
People who lost Malaysian citizenship
Naturalised citizens of Singapore
National University of Singapore alumni
Alumni of the University of Liverpool
Nanyang Technological University alumni
21st-century women engineers